Desmond Tan (born 19 August 1986) is a Singaporean actor and was named as one of the 8 Dukes of Caldecott Hill.

Career
Tan first came to prominence in the entertainment industry when he finished runner-up to Andie Chen in Star Search 2007. He was awarded a contract with MediaCorp and began his part time acting career with some minor roles in various Channel 8 dramas. After almost five years in the industry, Tan won his first award, the Rocket Award, at the 2012 Star Awards for the biggest breakthrough after a critically acclaimed performance as rickshaw driver Luo Xiaoxiao in the anniversary drama A Song to Remember. Tan's rising popularity also earned him the ambassadorship of Samsung's GALAXY Camera in 2012 and later, as Samsung Mobile's Lifestyle Ambassador for the GALAXY S4 in 2013.

Tan has gotten 6 out of 10 Top 10 Most Popular Male Artistes in 2014, 2017, 2018, 2019, 2021 and 2022 respectively.

Personal life
Desmond Tan was educated at Pioneer Secondary School and Jurong Junior College. After Star Search 2007, he juggled acting commitments with studies at the National University of Singapore. He studied real estate and graduated with an honours degree in 2011.

On 7 December 2021, Tan married his university sweetheart at a ceremony held in France.

Filmography

Film

Television

Variety Show

Compilation album

Discography

Awards and nominations

References

External links
 on toggle.sg

Living people
1986 births
Singaporean male television actors
National University of Singapore alumni
Singaporean people of Chinese descent